The administrative divisions of Manchukuo consisted of a number of provinces plus the 
special municipalities of Xinjing (新京特別市) and Harbin (哈爾浜特別市), and the  Beiman Special Region (北満特別区).

The number of provinces was five in 1932, corresponding to the original provinces under Qing dynasty China. The number was increased to 19 by 1941. Each province was further divided into prefectures (four in Xing'an East and 24 in Fengtian). Beiman Special Region lasted less than 3 years (July 1, 1933 - January 1, 1936) while Harbin was later incorporated into Binjiang Province.

See also
History of the administrative divisions of China (1912–49)

Subdivisions of Manchukuo